KWVA (88.1 FM) is a college radio station broadcasting from the EMU building on the University of Oregon campus in Eugene, Oregon, United States.  Licensed to the University of Oregon, it serves the Eugene/Springfield metropolitan area and has a live online stream.  KWVA primarily plays a varied mix of music, in addition talk shows and live college sports broadcasts.

KWVA regularly broadcasts a variety of locally produced and syndicated news programs including Democracy Now!, broadcast every weekday morning from 7:00–8:00 am, Health Matters broadcast Mondays 7:00pm–7:30pm, Anarchy Hour broadcast Tuesdays 7:00pm–7:30pm, and Occupy Radio broadcast Wednesdays 7:00pm–7:30pm.

KWVA regularly broadcasts University of Oregon athletics played in Eugene, including football, softball, volleyball and women's soccer. KWVA Sports also calls local high school football and basketball games.

KWVA is wholly student-operated and owned, though community members not affiliated with the University of Oregon can volunteer to be on-air DJs.

Since Winter 2009, KWVA has kept up-to-date playlists of every show aired in an online database.

History
KWVA began broadcasting in 1993. But the start of student radio at the University of Oregon began long before. Students and faculty worked together in the operation of KWAX, which was operated out of the UO Department of Speech. It served as an academic laboratory providing daily services for the campus and community from studios in Villard Hall. In the 1970s, KWAX affiliated with the Corporation for Public Broadcasting, hired a staff and affiliated with NPR. Two years later, the university cut its academic ties with the station and by the early 1980s there were no students involved at KWAX. KWAX moved off campus and turned into the classical music station that it continues to be today.

In the late 1980s, a group of students decided to start a new student radio station. Gary Rosenstein and James January spent months collecting the necessary 1,800 signatures to get the student government to bring the student station up for a vote. During this time KWAX was applying for a construction permit for a new facility broadcasting at 88.1FM on an existing antenna at Blanton Heights in South Eugene. Mr. January struck a deal with KWAX. KWAX would operate children's programming from 9 am – 2 pm and UO students would broadcast for the remainder of the day.

The new student station was to be called KRMA, for Real Music Alternative. Studio equipment was donated, thus reducing the start-up costs and allowing on other costs such as construction, production equipment and a microwave link to the Blanton Heights tower. Estimated cost was to be $25,000.

On April 27, 1990, following a student body vote, the ASUO senate granted funding for a new mixed format student radio station, a total of $25,861 to cover the costs of construction and first year of operation. The measure was passed by more than four to one and students anticipated tuning into the station when they returned to campus the next fall. Due to FCC objections, namely interference due to antenna position, KWAX reconsidered its second service thus allowing KRMA to move ahead with university approval. An amended application was submitted in April 1992 proposing a name change to KWVA and a relocation of the antenna to the roof of Prince Lucien Campbell Hall, the highest building on the University of Oregon campus.

On May 27, 1993 at 1:32 pm, KWVA broadcast its first song, "Hey Mr. DJ" by They Might Be Giants. It took nearly three years for January and Rosenstein to see fruitful efforts, and by that time they had both graduated. In June 1992, Michael Lovelady replaced January as the station manager and Alyssa Jenson took over for Lovelady in 1993.

In 2006, KWVA hired its first full-time station manager Charlotte Nisser. Nisser was a student volunteer at KWVA while in undergraduate studies at the UO and accepted the full-time position while in grad school.

In February 2008, KWVA received FCC approval for a construction permit to relocate the KWVA transmitter from the top of Prince Lucien Campbell Hall to Goodpasture Island Road and increase signal strength from 500 watts to 1,000 watts. KWVA requested funding from the ASUO to pay for the one-time installation and equipment expense to make this upgrade and relocation. Funding was approved and installation was successful, upgrading KWVA with modern broadcasting capabilities and vastly increasing its potential listenership to include all of Eugene/Springfield and surrounding areas.

On June 20, 2016, KWVA moved from the EMU Suite M-112 (a former women's restroom for an on-air studio) to the renovated EMU Basement Suite 45. A special on air program was compiled by then current and alumni volunteers and staff. From 8am-9:30am a Goodbye show was broadcast, followed by symbolic dead air from 9:30am-10am, and a return to the air with a Hello and New Beginnings show from 10am-noon. The same first song, 'Hey Mr DJ' by They Might Be Giants, was broadcast upon return to the air. Staff and volunteers spent the day relocating the contents of Studio A (the women's restroom on-air studio) to the new radio station, most of the contents of the station (main office, equipment, student office) had been moved the week prior when professional moving help was provided by the EMU. The move to new space was part of an overall EMU renovation and new construction, coming in at $95 million for the entire building. The new radio facility was designed specifically for KWVA by General Manager Charlotte Nisser, with input from and many students and volunteers over a several-year period. Suite 45 is about 3x the size of the original KWVA in Suite M-112.

WVA
WVA
University of Oregon
1994 establishments in Oregon
Radio stations established in 1994